Chongqing East railway station is a railway station currently under construction in Chongqing, China. The construction of the station hall started in 2022, and it is expected to be completed in 2025. It will serve as a stop on Chongqing–Hunan High-speed Railway, Shanghai–Chongqing–Chengdu High-speed Railway and Chongqing–Wanzhou High-speed Railway.

Metro station 
Line 6, Line 8, Line 24, and Line 27 of Chongqing Rail Transit will have a stop at Chongqing East.

References 

Railway stations in Chongqing